The 1922 International Lawn Tennis Challenge was the 17th edition of what is now known as the Davis Cup. The tournament saw first-time entries from Italy and Romania. Australasia would storm through the preliminary round, but would fall to defending champions the United States in the challenge round. The final was played at the West Side Tennis Club in New York City, United States on 1–5 September.

Draw

First round
India vs. Romania

Australasia vs. Belgium

Quarterfinals
Great Britain vs. Italy

Spain vs. India

Australasia vs. Czechoslovakia

Denmark vs. France

Semifinals
Australasia vs. France

Final
Australasia vs. Spain

Challenge Round
United States vs. Australasia

Notes

References

External links
Davis Cup official website

Davis Cups by year
International Lawn Tennis Challenge
International Lawn Tennis Challenge
1922 in sports in New York City